Charles Albert Tanner (January 29, 1887—February 12, 1970) was a politician in Manitoba, Canada.  He served in the Legislative Assembly of Manitoba from 1920 to 1927, as a member of the Labour Party.

Tanner was first elected to the Manitoba legislature in the provincial election of 1920, defeating Liberal and Farmer candidates in the Winnipeg-area constituency of Kildonan and St. Andrews.  He was re-elected in the 1922 election by a greater margin.  Tanner served on the opposition benches throughout his time in the legislature.

He appears to have sought re-election in the 1927 campaign as a supporter of the Progressive government of John Bracken, though still identifying himself as a "Labour" candidate.  He was defeated, finishing third against Conservative James McLenaghen.

Tanner ran for the House of Commons of Canada in the federal election of 1930, as a candidate of the Independent Labour Party in Winnipeg South.  He finished a distant third against Conservative Ronald Rogers.  At the time, he listed his occupation as "editor".

1887 births
1970 deaths
Dominion Labour Party (Manitoba) MLAs
Candidates in the 1930 Canadian federal election